Omorgus is a genus of beetles of the family Trogidae with about 140 species worldwide. Omorgus beetles are generally between 9 and 20 mm long.

Taxonomy
Omorgus has three subgenera, Omorgus (Omorgus), Omorgus (Afromorgus), and Omorgus (Haroldomorgus), with the following species:

Subgenus Omorgus 
 Omorgus alatus (Macleay, 1888)
 Omorgus alius (Scholtz, 1986)
 Omorgus alternans (W.S. Macleay, 1826)
 Omorgus amictus (Haaf, 1954)
 Omorgus aphanocephalus (Scholtz, 1986)
 Omorgus asper LeConte, 1854
 Omorgus augustae (Blackburn, 1892)
 Omorgus australasiae (Erichson, 1842)
 Omorgus badeni (Harold, 1872)
 Omorgus borrei (Harold, 1872)
 Omorgus brucki (Harold, 1872)
 Omorgus candezei (Harold, 1872)
 Omorgus candidus (Harold, 1872)
 Omorgus capillamentis Strümpher & Scholtz, 2011
 Omorgus carinatus (Loomis, 1922)
 Omorgus carinicollis (Scholtz, 1986)
 Omorgus ciliatus (Blanchard, 1846)
 Omorgus costatus (Wiedemann, 1823)
 Omorgus crotchi (Harold, 1871)
 Omorgus curvipes (Harold, 1872)
 Omorgus demarzi (Haaf, 1958)
 Omorgus dohrni (Harold, 1871)
 Omorgus elderi (Blackburn, 1892)
 Omorgus elongatus (Haaf, 1954)
 Omorgus euclensis (Blackburn, 1892)
 Omorgus eyrensis (Blackburn, 1904)
 Omorgus fuliginosus (Robinson, 1941)
 Omorgus gigas (Harold, 1872)
 Omorgus granuliceps (Haaf, 1954)
 Omorgus howdenorum (Scholtz, 1986)
 Omorgus howelli (Howden & Vaurie, 1957)
 Omorgus indigenus Scholtz, 1990
 Omorgus inflatus (Loomis, 1922)
 Omorgus insignicollis (Blackburn, 1896)
 Omorgus loxus (Vaurie, 1955)
 Omorgus lucidus Pittino, 2010
 Omorgus mariae (Scholtz, 1986)
 Omorgus mariettae (Scholtz, 1986)
 Omorgus marshalli (Haaf, 1957)
 Omorgus mentitor (Blackburn, 1896)
 Omorgus mictlensis Deloya, 1995
 Omorgus monachus (Herbst, 1790)
 Omorgus monteithi (Scholtz, 1986)
 Omorgus nanningensis Pittino, 2005
 Omorgus nigroscobinus (Scholtz, 1986)
 Omorgus nocheles Scholtz, 1990
 Omorgus nodicollis (Macleay, 1888)
 Omorgus nodosus (Robinson, 1940)
 Omorgus ovalis (Haaf, 1957)
 Omorgus pampeanus (Burmeister, 1876)
 Omorgus parvicollis (Scholtz, 1986)
 Omorgus pastillarius (Blanchard, 1846)
 Omorgus pellosomus (Scholtz, 1986)
 Omorgus perhispidus (Blackburn, 1904)
 Omorgus persuberosus (Vaurie, 1962)
 Omorgus punctatus (Germar, 1824)
 Omorgus quadridens (Blackburn, 1892)
 Omorgus quadrinodosus (Haaf, 1954)
 Omorgus regalis (Haaf, 1954)
 Omorgus rodriguezae Deloya, 2005
 Omorgus rotundulus (Haaf, 1957)
 Omorgus rubricans (Robinson, 1946)
 Omorgus salebrosus (Macleay, 1871)
 Omorgus scabrosus (Palisot de Beauvois, 1818)
 Omorgus scutellaris (Say, 1824)
 Omorgus semicostatus (Macleay, 1871)
 Omorgus setosipennis (Blackburn, 1904)
 Omorgus spatulatus (Vaurie, 1962)
 Omorgus squamosus (Macleay, 1871)
 Omorgus stellatus (Harold, 1872)
 Omorgus strzeleckensis (Blackburn, 1895)
 Omorgus subcarinatus (MacLeay, 1864)
 Omorgus suberosus (Fabricius, 1775)
 Omorgus tasmanicus (Blackburn, 1904)
 Omorgus tatei (Blackburn, 1892)
 Omorgus tessellatus LeConte, 1854
 Omorgus texanus LeConte, 1854
 Omorgus tomentosus (Robinson, 1941)
 Omorgus triestinae Pittino, 1987
 Omorgus trilobus (Haaf, 1954)
 Omorgus tytus (Robinson, 1941)
 Omorgus umbonatus LeConte, 1854
 Omorgus undaraensis Strümpher et al., 2014
 Omorgus villosus (Haaf, 1954)
 Omorgus vladislavi Kawai, 2009
Subgenus Afromorgus 
 Omorgus acinus Scholtz, 1980
 Omorgus amitinus (Kolbe, 1904)
 Omorgus asperulatus (Harold, 1872)
 Omorgus baccatus (Gerstaecker, 1867)
 Omorgus batesi (Harold, 1872)
 Omorgus bayoni (Pittino, 2011)
 Omorgus benadirensis (Pittino, 2011)
 Omorgus birmanicus (Arrow, 1927)
 Omorgus borgognoi (Marchand, 1902)
 Omorgus chinensis (Boheman, 1858)
 Omorgus consanguineus (Péringuey, 1901)
 Omorgus denticulatus (Olivier, 1789)
 Omorgus discedens (Haaf, 1954)
 Omorgus drumonti (Pittino, 2011)
 Omorgus elevatus (Harold, 1872)
 Omorgus endroedyi (Scholtz, 1979)
 Omorgus expansus (Arrow, 1900)
 Omorgus fenestrellus (Balthasar, 1939)
 Omorgus foveolatus (Boheman, 1860)
 Omorgus frater (Pittino, 2005)
 Omorgus freyi (Haaf, 1954)
 Omorgus funestus (Lansberge, 1886)
 Omorgus gemmatus (Olivier, 1789)
 Omorgus genieri Scholtz, 1991
 Omorgus granulatus (Herbst, 1783)
 Omorgus guttalis (Haaf, 1954)
 Omorgus haagi (Harold, 1872)
 Omorgus inclusus (Walker, 1858)
 Omorgus indicus (Harold, 1872)
 Omorgus inermis (Pittino, 2005)
 Omorgus insignis (Haaf, 1954)
 Omorgus italicus (Reiche, 1853)
 Omorgus lindemannae (Petrovitz, 1975)
 Omorgus lobicollis (Arrow, 1927)
 Omorgus lugubris (Haaf, 1954)
 Omorgus maindroni (Pittino, 2005)
 Omorgus maissouri (Haaf, 1954)
 Omorgus melancholicus (Fahraeus, 1857)
 Omorgus mollis (Arrow, 1927)
 Omorgus mutabilis (Haaf, 1954)
 Omorgus niloticus (Harold, 1872)
 Omorgus obesus (Scholtz, 1980)
 Omorgus omacanthus (Harold, 1872)
 Omorgus pauliani (Haaf, 1954)
 Omorgus ponderosus (Péringuey, 1901)
 Omorgus principalis (Haaf, 1954)
 Omorgus procerus (Harold, 1872)
 Omorgus radula (Erichson, 1843)
 Omorgus reiterorum (Kral & Kuban, 2012)
 Omorgus rimulosus (Haaf, 1957)
 Omorgus rusticus (Fåhraeus, 1857)
 Omorgus satorui Kawai, 2006
 Omorgus senegalensis (Scholtz, 1983)
 Omorgus squalidus (Olivier, 1789)
 Omorgus testudo (Arrow, 1927)
 Omorgus tuberosus Klug, 1855
 Omorgus unguicularis (Haaf, 1954)
 Omorgus varicosus (Erichson, 1843)
 Omorgus verrucosus (Reiche, 1856)
 Omorgus wittei (Haaf, 1955)
 Omorgus zumpti (Haaf, 1957)

References

Trogidae